Tungsten(III) chloride is the inorganic compound with the formula W6Cl18.  It is a cluster compound. It is a brown solid, obtainable by chlorination of tungsten(II) chloride.   Featuring twelve doubly bridging chloride ligands, the cluster adopts a structure related to the corresponding chlorides of niobium and tantalum.  In contrast, W6Cl12 features eight triply bridging chlorides.

A related mixed valence W(III)-W(IV) chloride is prepared by reduction of the hexachloride with bismuth:
9 WCl6  +  8 Bi  →   3 W3Cl10  +  8 BiCl3

References

Tungsten halides
Chlorides
Octahedral compounds